Lioptera is a genus of beetles in the family Carabidae, containing the following species:

 Lioptera bloetei Louwerens, 1953 
 Lioptera brevicornis Heller, 1903 
 Lioptera erotyloides Bates, 1883 
 Lioptera louwerensi Andrewes, 1941 
 Lioptera malayana Heller, 1903 
 Lioptera oberthueri Heller, 1903 
 Lioptera plato Bates, 1883 
 Lioptera pseuda Heller, 1903 
 Lioptera quadriguttata Chaudoir, 1869 
 Lioptera tetraspila Heller, 1903

References

Lebiinae